George Lam Tsz-Cheung (born 12 October 1947), also known professionally by his surname Lam, is a Hong Kong-based veteran Cantopop singer, singer-songwriter, music producer and actor, with a career that has so far lasted more than four decades. Lam produces most of his own albums, writes many of his own songs, occasionally writes for other artists, and covers other people's songs. Lam has a wide vocal range and is capable of interpreting and performing many different genres of music. He is heavily involved with planning and designing his concerts and his LP/CD covers. He was the one who came up with the first Cantopop rap, "Ah Lam's Diary", and he also pioneered the stringing together of multiple hit Cantopop songs to create a 10-minute long medley which is called "10 Minutes 12 Inches". In 2019, Lam interwove his songs together to put on a musical-like concert, Lamusical.

In addition to his singing career, Lam has also acted in some TV dramas, and played lead roles in many films, making his film debut in Luckies Trio in 1978.  Possibly his most memorable role was as a Japanese journalist in Boat People (1982), directed by Ann Hui.

Early life
Lam was born in Hong Kong to a family of physicians, with both his father (a Yuen Long obstetrician) and paternal grandfather (former hospital chief executive of Alice Ho Miu Ling Nethersole Hospital) being doctors. He attended Tak Sun Primary School, then Diocesan Boys' School,  a predominantly English-language boys school, where he was a boarder. At the latter school, he chose to study French rather than Chinese as a second language.

Lam started to pick up music at a young age. His grandfather often took him to movies, both Chinese and Western ones, which exposed him to film music. In addition, his mom loved to sing and dance while his dad loved listening to music and playing piano. All this constant music around him kindled his interest in this art form. He started to love listening to music on the radio when he was a teenager and taught himself to play guitar. In 1965, Lam left Hong Kong to further his studies in United Kingdom. During this time and his subsequent stay in the United States, his musical horizon was further broadened by exposure to a great variety of musical genres in those countries.

When he first went to United Kingdom in 1965, he attended Dover College (he was a Leamingtonian there) under the headship of Timothy Cobb. His long time pal Ching Y. Wong, S.C., also from Diocesan Boys' School. attended there as well. After about a year, he transferred to Barcote School of Coaching to join his brother, Tony. There he formed a folk song group, the Midnighters, with two friends. Lam paid a return visit to both colleges in January 2019.

Career
After his studies in the UK, Lam remained for a few years for work before moving to California, where he coached tennis and worked in a stock brokerage firm. It was during this time that Lam started writing his own songs. Not long thereafter, he returned to Hong Kong to launch his music career.
 
Lam started as one of the lead singers in the band "Jade".  In 1976, he went solo with the releae of his first English album, "Lam". His first Cantonese album came out in 1978. In 1980, two of his compositions ("In The Middle of The Water"《在水中央》and "Need You Every Minute"《分分鐘需要你》) won Top Ten Chinese Gold Songs Awards. Throughout the 1980s, 23 of Lam's songs topped the RTHK Chinese Pop Chart, making him second only to Alan Tam, who had 28. 

Over the years, he has introduced a wide variety of song styles to the Hong Kong pop music scene, with many originals and covers becoming Cantopop classics. He taps into a wide variety of sources to choose which songs to do covers of, including songs from the United Kingdom, United States, Continental Europe, Russia, Middle East, Latin America, Japan, etc. The pieces he selects to cover range in genre from folk songs, classical music, and musicals, to funk and rock and roll. His work encompasses a wide stylistic range, from country rock, rhythm and blues, rock and roll, funk, jazz, rap, traditional Chinese songs, to tango and bossa nova. Lam has also hosted television music programs, acted in tele-dramas, and played lead roles on film.

During a May 2003 performance at the Hong Kong Coliseum, Lam accidentally fell 2.5 metres through a stage floor opening while performing as a guest of Lisa Wang. The accident injured his right ear, resulting in partial hearing loss, particularly in high frequencies, and tinnitus. Thereafter, he could essentially only hear sounds in mono. A few months after his injury, he gave a series of concerts across southern China for the purpose of acclimating himself to performing with his altered hearing. During this short period, he readily adapted to this new reality and was able to perform "like normal" on stage, thereby resuming his career in full.

Lam has remained active for more than four decades. Over this timespan, he has gained not only the recognition and respect of peers such as Anita Mui, Leslie Cheung, and Paula Tsui, but he has also played a significant role in shaping the Hong Kong music scene. Many of today's top singers such as Eason Chan, Hacken Lee, and Andy Lau have been influenced by his music.

In recognition of his contribution to music, Lam was given numerous awards, including the Golden Needle Award in 1994, the CASH Hall of Fame Award in 2003, the J.S.G. Lifetime Achievement Award in 2015, and the RTHK Hall of Fame Award in 2016.

Personal life
Lam married Ng Ching Yuen in 1980. Together, they have a son, Alex Lam Tak Shun, who is also a singer and actor, and a daughter April. Lam and Ng divorced in 1994. On 17 July 1996, he married singer and actress Sally Yeh. As Sally and Alex were raised abroad, neither Alex nor Sally can read Chinese, so he writes pronunciation guides for them.

In sports, Lam used to love playing tennis, and now he loves playing golf. Besides composing songs, his creativity also gets him into drawing, and he has a particular fondness for drawing mazes. In 2013, an intricate maze artwork drawn by Lam was depicted and engraved onto the cassock of a Lalique crystal Buddha. This was the very first collaboration project that the French brand Lalique had worked with a Chinese artist. Lam also likes tailoring, often modifying used clothes he purchases to his own taste.

Voice and timbre
Lam has a very wide tenor range. His highest notes could reach F5, D#6 in full voice and volume rather than soft falsetto. His lowest note is G2, ten notes below middle C (C4).

Discography

Albums

Cantonese albums 
各師各法 (1978)
抉擇 (1979)
摩登土佬 (1980)
一個人 (1980)
活色生香 (1981)
海市蜃樓 (1982)
愛情故事 (July 1983)
愛到發燒 (April 1984)
林子祥創作歌集 (December 1984)
林子祥85特輯 (LAM '85) (April 1985)
十分十二吋 (12" Single) (August 1985)
誘惑 (December 1985)
最愛 (June 1986)
千億個夜晚 (January 1987)
花街70號 (July 1987)
林子祥創作+歌集 (January 1988)
生命之曲 (October 1988)
林子祥長青歌集 (November 1989)
十三子祥 (August 1990)
日落日出 (November 1990)
小說歌集 (August 1991)
最難忘的你 (March 1992)
祈望 (December 1992)
林子祥'93創作歌集 (August 1993)
單手拍掌  (December 1994)
緣是這樣 (June 1996)
好氣連祥 (September 1997)
現代人新曲+精選 (October 1998)
只有林子祥 (2001)
Until We Meet Again (2004)
佐治地球轉 (2007)
Lamusique (2010)
Lamusique Vintage  (2011)
LAMUSIC Original Classics  (2014)
佐治地球40年  (2015)

English albums 
Lam (1976)
Lam II (1977)
Teresa Carpio & Lam (1978)
Lessons (1990)
When a Man Loves a Woman (1993)

Mandarin albums 
"這是你是真的傷了我的心" (1991)
"這樣愛過你" (1992)
"決定" (1993)
"感謝" (1995)
"尋祥歌" (1998)

Songs written by George Lam for his own albums 
1977年 Lam II – Boring Love (+ lyrics)、Up-Down (+ lyrics)
1978年 各師各法 – 三個願望、確係愛得悶
1979年 抉擇 – 點解娶老婆
1980年 摩登土佬 – 分分鐘需要你、愛的美敦書、願愛得浪漫、廣告廣告
1980年 一個人 – 在水中央、她的歌聲、執到寶、轉轉轉
1981年 林子祥精選 – 愛的種子
1981年 活色生香 – 活色生香、究竟天有幾高、再生人、沙漠小子、有句話、七月初七、走馬燈、可以不可以
1982年 海市蜃樓 – 海市蜃樓、今天開始、幾段情歌
1983年 愛情故事 – 小男人主義、懶舒服、熱血青年、阿喲心聲、巴黎街頭
1984年 愛到發燒 – 邁步向前、我偷望你偷看、石像
1984年 林子祥創作歌集 – 水仙情、師傅教落、紅日豐收、再見楊柳、跳躍太陽下、誰能明白我、心肝寶貝、追憶、床上的法國煙、此情可待、說聲珍重
1985年 林子祥85特輯 (LAM '85) – Moments (+lyrics)、仍然記得嗰一次、零時十分、星光的背影
1985年 誘惑 – 這一個夜、千枝針刺在心、為誰忙
1986年 最愛 – Ah Lam日記 ( wrote the lyrics in Cantonese)、曾經、冷冰冰的形象、一個早上 
1987年 千億個夜晚 – 風雨故人來、單身女人、今生以後 
1987年 花街70號 – April (+ lyrics)、似曾相識
1988年 林子祥創作+流行歌集 – 每夜唱不停、雨點、昨日街頭、幻覺、Talking About (+ lyrics)
1988年 生命之曲 – 誰為你、真的漢子、三心一意、今晚可有空 
1989年 長青歌集 – 勝敗之間、矛盾
1990年 十三子祥 – 似夢迷離、一咬O.K.
1990年 日落日出 – 日落日出
1990年 Lessons – Without The 2 Of Us、Tennis Nemesis、Sabbatical、He Said、Talking About、Lessons、April、Three Wishes、Boring Love、It's Only Goodbye(+ lyrics of all the songs)
1991年 小說歌集 –  懷念這深深一吻、怎麼可以沒有你、原來沒有你是這樣
1991年 這次你是真的傷了我的心 (Mandarin) – 不要笑我痴、當時年紀小、這次你是真的傷了我的心、戀愛無所不在、回首夢已遠
1992年 我這樣愛過你 (Mandarin) – 夜、Three Wishes (+ lyrics)、聲聲問、願今宵永在夢裏
1992年 祈望 –  祈望、一笑置之、急促的心跳、如風如煙
1992年 最難忘的你 – 將心意盡訴、獨自暢飲、改變常改變、人海中一個你
1993年 林子祥93創作歌集 – 交出一切、你心有我、終生伙伴、我的一生、歸向平淡、偶像、你令我找到自己、愛偏偏要別離、曾經滄海、舊居中的鋼琴、一團和氣
1993年 決定 (Mandarin) –  那年冬天、注定多情、愛你到此為止
1994年 單手拍掌 – 你是朋友、不可能沒有你、我走我路、今天的一切、單手拍掌、在這世界有你最好、無愧於心、小屋的風雨
1995年 感謝 (Mandarin) – 回首來時路、情關、在水中央、無言的愛
1996年 緣是這樣 – 十八變、我以你自豪、緣是這樣、快樂的真相、十分鐘意、有情天地、感激
1997年 好氣連祥 – 擁抱、愛情、人間好漢、最遠偏偏最近、谷爆、知己
1998年 現代人新曲+精選 – 現代人、百年之癢、簡簡單單、醉一半
1998年 尋祥歌 (Mandarin) – 夜歸的男人、最愛的人不是我、貪戀、千言萬語都是愛、自在、傷口還在、為自己鼓掌、越愛越沉默、快樂歌、狂歡
2001年 只有林子祥 – 只有夢長、萬里天風伴我飛、我好想、愛與被愛
2002年 港樂 林子祥 – The Prayer ( + worked with 潘源良 on the lyrics)
2004年 Until We Meet Again – Until We Meet Again、美而廉、講笑、我們笑 (Mandarin)
2007年 佐治地球轉 – 常在我心中、Angel、自由行、流離半世、林振祥、Through Your Eyes (+ lyrics)、前世、問天不應、很多很多、誰都可以( +worked with 潘源良 on the lyrics)、腹語、我的秘密 (+ lyrics in Mandarin)
2011年 Lamusique Vintage – Invincible ( + lyrics)
2014年 LAMUSIC Original Classics – 衝上雲霄、Make My Day (+ lyrics)、小苹果、秘密花園 
2014年 單曲 – 東方傳奇 (東方足球隊會歌)
2015年 單曲 – 粵唱越響 (跨粵流行嘅主題曲)

Songs written by George Lam for other artists 
路家敏 小貓與我
杜麗莎 仍然記得個一次
林嘉寶 幸運兒
徐小鳳 星光的背影 、在水中央
陳百強 寵愛
梅艷芳 抱緊眼前人
葉蒨文 零時十分
葉蒨文 蒨意
葉蒨文 願意
葉蒨文 完全是你
側田 有火
張敬軒 相對論

Concerts held in Hong Kong 
1976 《Teresa Carpio & George Lam Concert》
1981 《林子祥Show》
1983 《林子祥演唱會》
1985 《林子祥85演唱會》
1987 《林子祥演唱會》
1988 《LAM 88-89 LIVE》
1990 《特醇星徽林子祥90演唱會》
1992 《白花油林子祥有情演唱會》
1995 《林子祥寄廿載情演唱會95》95 Lam in Live
1998 《林子祥葉蒨文好氣連場98'》
 2001《最愛接觸林子祥演唱會》  Live Contact Lam 2001
2001 《01年拉闊壓軸 林子祥&陳奕迅音樂會》
2002  《港樂·林子祥HKPO & Lam Live》
2005  《子有祥情林子祥演唱會》  " Always" Lam in Concert
2007  《仍然最愛林子祥杜麗莎演唱會》Teresa & Lam Live at the HK Coliseum 2007
2009  《十分十二子祥演唱會》Lam@Coliseum 
2010  《Lam Made in Love 音樂會》
2011  《Vintage Lamusic Concert 》
2011  《Music is Love George Lam X Hacken Lee》 《林子祥x李克勤 拉闊音樂會2011》
2013  《絕對熹祥- A Mix & Match Concert with 林子祥 & 趙增熹》
2016  《林子祥佐治地球四十年演唱會》George Lam 40th Anniversary Concert – Hong Kong
2019  《林子祥 Lamusical 2019 演唱會》Lamusical2019

Filmography
(actor unless otherwise noted)

References

External links

  	 

1947 births
Living people
Cantopop singer-songwriters
Hong Kong singer-songwriters
Hong Kong Mandopop singers
English-language singers from Hong Kong
Hong Kong Buddhists
Hong Kong tenors
Hong Kong record producers
Hong Kong composers
Hong Kong male television actors
20th-century Hong Kong male actors
Hong Kong male film actors
20th-century Hong Kong male singers
21st-century Hong Kong male actors
21st-century Hong Kong male singers
People educated at Dover College